In computing, Microsoft Azure Active Directory, commonly known as Azure AD, is a system in Microsoft Azure that enables the identity management to configure accessibility of users and groups to services and resources. It shares the same name with a similar directory service found in Windows Server, but Azure Active Directory is not a replacement of the on-premises local directory service. Azure AD is based on Active Directory, but incorporates different features such as providing identity as a service (IDaaS).

See also 
 Azure AD Connect
 Active Directory

References

Further reading

External links
 

Active Directory
Directory services
Microsoft cloud services